Club Hipico de Concepcion, also called the Mediocamino, is a Thoroughbred race track in Hualpen near Concepcion in the Bio-Bio Region of Chile. It features a right-handed nine-furlong dirt track. Currently, no major races are run at the Mediocamino.

Four-time American Champion jockey José A. Santos, a native of Concepcion, started his career at the track.

External links
 Home Page

 Racecourse Profile on Horse Racing South America

Horse racing venues in Chile
Sports venues in Biobío Region